Paddy McGuire (1884 - 16 November 1923) was an Irish actor.

Biography
Paddy McGuire was born in Ireland in 1884 or 1885. McGuire was a regular supporting player in the films of Chaplin and others, but never had a starring role. McGuire died on 16 November 1923 in Norwalk, California, supposedly of insanity and/or paralysis as a result of syphilis.

Partial filmography

The Champion (1915)
A Jitney Elopement (1915)
The Tramp (1915)
By the Sea (1915)
Work (1915)
The Bank (1915)
Shanghaied (1915)
A Night in the Show (1915)
Police (1916)
A Broadway Cowboy (1920)

References

External links

1880s births
1923 deaths
20th-century Irish male actors
Irish expatriate male actors in the United States
Irish male silent film actors